Journalism in Washington (then a U.S. territory) began with the publication of newspapers in the cities of Port Townsend, Steilacoom, and Olympia in the 1860s. By then, there had been journalism in Oregon for as long as a decade.

See also 
 List of newspapers in Washington (state)
 Wikipedia:WikiProject Missing encyclopedic articles/List of US Newspapers/Washington
 List of African-American newspapers in Washington (state)

References

Further reading 
 Newspaper Profiles from Washington Digital Newspapers project (local partner of Chronicling America / Library of Congress project)
 Washington newspapers in the Chronicling America collection
 Washington Newspaper Publishers Association
 Its monthly newsletter, The Washington Newspaper (TWN), covers community papers in Washington. Note, especially, its annual "Better Newspaper Contest" awards. Some earlier editions available on Google Books, e.g.: 

Historical materials
 Pioneer Papers of Puget Sound, Oregon Historical Quarterly, 1903.
 Listing of territorial newspapers by city, compiled by Edmond S. Meany for the Washington Historical Quarterly and Pacific Northwest Quarterly (starting 1922). It was published serially, organized by city name:
 Aberdeen to Index | Kalama – Olympia | Orondo – Ruby | Seabeck – Seattle (1) | Seattle (2) – Snohomish | Snohomish – Yakima
 (See also the Google Books version, which mashes up the Pacific Northwest Quarterly with the WA Hist Quarterly)
 Later updates to Meany's articles by J. Orin Oliphant:
 1927 additions: 
 1948 additions (JSTOR):

Online databases
 Washington State Library page on newspapers. This site links to a number of online resources for finding the contents of newspapers.
 OfficialUSA page on WA newspapers
 ABYZ page on WA newspapers
 Washington public notices
 mondotimes.com

Newspapers published in Washington (state)
American journalism